Steffen Justus (born 15 April 1982) is a German triathlete.

At the 2012 Summer Olympics men's triathlon on Tuesday 7 August he placed 16th.

References

1982 births
Living people
German male triathletes
Triathletes at the 2012 Summer Olympics
Olympic triathletes of Germany
Place of birth missing (living people)
20th-century German people
21st-century German people